is a Japanese manga series written and illustrated by Roku Sakura. It was serialized in Kadokawa Shoten's seinen manga magazine Young Ace from April 2016 to September 2022, with its chapters collected in 12 tankōbon volumes. An anime adaptation has been announced.

Media

Manga
Written and illustrated by Roku Sakura, Busu ni Hanataba o was serialized in Kadokawa Shoten's seinen manga magazine Young Ace from April 4, 2016, to September 2, 2022. Kadokawa collected its chapters in twelve tankōbon volumes, released from November 4, 2016, to November 4, 2022.

Volume list

Anime
In November 2022, it was announced that the manga will receive an anime adaptation.

Reception
The series placed 5th in the print category on the 5th edition of Next Manga Award in 2019.

References

Further reading

External links
  
 

Anime series based on manga
Kadokawa Shoten manga
Romantic comedy anime and manga
Seinen manga